Cleaning is the process of removing unwanted substances, such as dirt, infectious agents, and other impurities, from an object or environment.

Cleaning may also refer to:

Digital technology
 Data cleansing or data cleaning, the process of detecting and correcting (or removing) corrupt or inaccurate records from a record set, table, or database
 Data scrubbing, an error correction technique applied to main memory or storage
 Infrared cleaning, a technique used by some film scanners and flatbed scanners to reduce or remove the effect of dust and scratches upon the finished scan
 Sanitization (classified information), the removal of sensitive information from a document or other message

Other uses
 Cleaning (forestry), the practice of selecting desirable trees in a young stand and removing trees that threaten their development
 Silviculture cleaning, the release of select saplings from competition by overtopping trees of a comparable age
 Organizing, as in professional organizing

See also
Clean (disambiguation)
Cleanliness
Cleansing (disambiguation)